Jhuddo (or Jhudo) is a city in Mirpur Khas District, Sindh province, Pakistan with a population of 4.5 lac, its postcode is 69310, Recently, it had acquired the status of Taluka/Tehsil.

See also 
Jhudo railway station
Sabzi Mandi

Populated places in Mirpur Khas District